The 2010 Dunedin mayoral election occurred on Saturday, 9 October 2010 and was conducted under the Single Transferable Voting system.

The candidates for mayor included Peter Chin, the incumbent who contested for a third consecutive term. He faced six other candidates. Of these, three stood in the 2007 mayoral race (former councillor Lee Vandervis, who came second, Olivier Lequeux, who came fifth, and Jimmy Knowles, who finished last). Other candidates include incumbent city councillor Dave Cull, Aaron Hawkins and Kevin Dwyer.

Dave Cull won the mayoral election becoming Dunedin's 57th mayor.

Opinion polling

Results
44770

See also 
2010 Dunedin local elections

References

External links 
 Dunedin City Council Results

2010 elections in New Zealand
2010
Politics of Dunedin
2010s in Dunedin